Mitchell Kenny (born 15 January 1998) is an Australian professional rugby league footballer who plays as a  for the Penrith Panthers in the NRL.  He is a NRL premiership winning player of 2022.

Early life
Born in Sydney, New South Wales, Kenny grew up in the suburb of McGraths Hill and was educated at Arndell Anglican College, Oakville.

Kenny played junior rugby league for Windsor Wolves before being selected for the Penrith Panthers under-17 development squad.

Kenny also played SG Ball with Penrith, winning various matches throughout that year, including the national under-18's championship. He started to move his way up through the ranks of Penrith, playing with the under-20s team for two years and then moving onto their Canterbury Cup NSW squad.

Career

2019
Kenny made his first grade debut in round 11 of the 2019 NRL season for Penrith in their 16–10 victory over the Parramatta Eels at the new Western Sydney Stadium.

2020
Kenny was limited to only six games for Penrith in the 2020 NRL season and missed on playing in the clubs Grand Final loss to Melbourne.

2021
Kenny played 18 games for Penrith in the 2021 NRL season but missed out on playing in Penrith's 2021 NRL Grand Final victory over South Sydney due to an injury he sustained during the clubs victory over Parramatta in the semi-final.

2022
Ahead of the 2022 NRL season, Kenny re-signed with the Penrith Panthers until the end of the 2024 season. During round 4 of the 2022 season, he scored his first NRL try in Penrith's 32–12 victory over the Canterbury-Bankstown Bulldogs at Western Sydney Stadium.
Kenny played 24 games for Penrith throughout the season including the clubs 2022 NRL Grand Final victory over Parramatta.

2023
On 18 February, Kenny played in Penrith's 13-12 upset loss to St Helens RFC in the 2023 World Club Challenge.

References

External links

Penrith Panthers profile

1998 births
Living people
Australian rugby league players
Penrith Panthers captains
Penrith Panthers players
Rugby league hookers
Rugby league players from Sydney